Magdalena Maria Schneider (17 May 1909 – 30 July 1996) was a German actress and singer. She was the mother of the actress Romy Schneider.

Biography 
Magdalena Maria Schneider was born in Augsburg, Bavaria, the daughter of a plumber. She attended a Catholic girls' school and a commercial college; thereafter she worked as a stenographer in a grain store. At the same time, Schneider studied singing at the Leopold Mozart Conservatory in Augsburg and ballet at the municipal theater. She made her stage debut at the Staatstheater am Gärtnerplatz in Munich. Schneider drew the attention of the Austrian director Ernst Marischka who called her to the Theater an der Wien in Vienna, and in 1930 gave Schneider her first film role.

While filming in 1933, Schneider met her future husband, the Austrian actor Wolf Albach-Retty. The couple married in 1937 and had two children: Rosemarie Magdalena, called Romy, and Wolf-Dieter, later a surgeon, born in 1941. During World War II, Schneider lived in the Bavarian Alps near Hitler's retreat in the Obersalzberg above Berchtesgaden. Schneider was a guest of Hitler's, who declared that she was his favorite actress. Later she and Albach-Retty separated and the marriage ended in divorce in 1945.

After the war, offers for movies initially were few. Schneider again began filming in 1948 and promoted her daughter's career with the joint appearance in the film When the White Lilacs Bloom Again (1953) directed by Hans Deppe, a typical 1950s Heimatfilm which was the film debut of her daughter, 14-year-old Romy Schneider. In the same year Magda Schneider married the Cologne restaurant owner .

Magda Schneider arranged further appearances with her daughter in several movies such as Mädchenjahre einer Königin (Victoria in Dover, 1954), the films of the Sissi trilogy based on the life of Empress Elisabeth of Austria, with Romy Schneider starring in the title role and Magda Schneider playing the role of her mother Princess Ludovika of Bavaria, and in  Die Halbzarte (Eva, 1958). Magda Schneider's role in the 1933 film Liebelei (1933) was also played by her daughter, Romy Schneider, in the remake Christine (1958).

Schneider died in 1996 at her house in Schönau near Berchtesgaden, Bavaria.

Selected filmography 

 Boycott (1930) – Zofe
 Wrong Number, Miss (1932) – Inge Becker – Telefonistin
 A Bit of Love (1932) – Anny, seine Sekretärin
 Two in a Car (1932) – Lisa Krüger
 The Song of Night (1932) – Mathilde
 Sehnsucht 202 (1932) – Magda
 Tell Me Tonight (1932) – Mathilde Pategg
 The Testament of Cornelius Gulden (1932) – Flox Winter
 Overnight Sensation (1932) – Edith
 La chanson d'une nuit (1933) – Mathilde
 Marion, That's Not Nice (1933) – Marion – Satorius Tochter
 Liebelei (1933) – Christine Weyring – seine Tochter
 A Love Story (1933) – Christine Weyring
 Kind, ich freu' mich auf Dein Kommen (1933) – Lili Schrader
 Going Gay (1933) – Grete A Viennese Girl
 Bon Voyage (1933) – Monika Brink
 Ich kenn' dich nicht und liebe dich (1934) – Gloria Claassen
 Ein Mädel wirbelt durch die Welt (1934) – Leonore 'Lenox' Brehmer
 Tales from the Vienna Woods (1934) – Milly Scheffers
 Miss Liselott (1934) – Liselotte Fischer
 Die Katz' im Sack (1935) – Irene Ferenczy
 Winter Night's Dream (1935) – Hilde Müller
 Eva, the Factory Girl (1935) – Eva
 Forget Me Not (1935) – Liselotte Heßfeld – seine Sekretärin
 Die lustigen Weiber (1936) – Viola Evans
 Rendezvous in Wien (1936) – Gusti Aigner
 Die Puppenfee (1936) – Komtess Felizitas – ihre Nichte
 Prater (1936) – Tini
 Geheimnis eines alten Hauses (1936) – Mary Hofmeyer
 Woman's Love—Woman's Suffering (1937) – Marie Haßler
 Musik für dich (1937) – Hella
 Ihr Leibhusar (1938) – Marie Toldy
 Frühlingsluft (1938) – Elli Nolte
 The Woman at the Crossroads (1938) – Dr.med. Hanna Weigand
 Who's Kissing Madeleine? (1939) – Madeleine Pasqual
 The Right to Love (1939) – Vroni Mareiter
 The Girl at the Reception (1940) – Beate
 Herzensfreud – Herzensleid (1940) – Toni, seine Tochter
 Am Abend auf der Heide (1941) – Änne
 Die heimlichen Bräute (1942) – Inge Thiele
 Liebeskomödie (1943) – Christel Schönbach
 Two Happy People (1943)
 A Man for My Wife (1943) – Dagmar Stollberg
 Eines Tages (1945) – Bettina Pahlen
 Ein Mann gehört ins Haus (1948) – Loni Tannhofer
 Die Sterne lügen nicht (1950) – Frau Bürgermeister Brigitte Krambach
 When the White Lilacs Bloom Again (1953) – Therese Forster
 Love is Forever (1954) – Mrs. Vogelreuther
 Victoria in Dover (1954) – Baroness Lehzen
 Die Deutschmeister (1955) – Therese Hübner
 Sissi (1955) – Duchess Ludovika in Bayern / Vickie
 Sissi – The Young Empress (1956) – Duchess Ludovika in Bayern
 The Girl and the Legend (1957) – Mrs. Cantley
 Von allen geliebt (1957) – Lotte Fürst
 Sissi – Fateful Years of an Empress (1957) – Duchess Ludovika of Bavaria
 The House of Three Girls (1958) – Frau Tschöll
 Eva (1959) – Mutter Dassau
 Verdammt die jungen Sünder nicht'' (1961) – Vera Jüttner

References

External links

Filmography, photographs, literature 

1909 births
1996 deaths
German film actresses
Actors from Augsburg
20th-century German actresses
German stage actresses
20th-century German women singers